Cliff Sherman is a retired American football coach. He served as the first varsity head coach of Stonehill College in Easton, Massachusetts, compiling a record of 6–5–1.

After retiring from collegiate coaching, he returned to Attleboro High School in Attleboro, Massachusetts, where he had previously served as the head coach in 1969 and 1970, and led that team again from 1999 until his retirement in 2001.

Head coaching record

College

References

External links
 Attleboro Area Hall of Fame profile

Year of birth missing (living people)
Living people
Providence Friars football coaches
Stonehill Skyhawks football coaches
High school football coaches in Massachusetts